TCP Fusion is a feature for providing TCP loopback and is implemented in the Transmission Control Protocol (TCP) stack within Oracle' Solaris-10 and Solaris-11 operating systems as well as a number of software projects based on the open source codebase from the OpenSolaris project.  The idea is trivial in that a client and server connection on a local loopback interface within the same system should not need the entire TCP/IP protocol stack to exchange data. Therefore, provide a faster data path with the fusion of the two end points.

The source code is well documented in inet/tcp/tcp_fusion.c which clearly states:

The feature may be enabled or disabled via the /etc/system config file for the Solaris or genunix kernel and the only line required is "set ip:do_tcp_fusion = 0x0" which set the feature off or FALSE while of "0x1" for hexadecimal TRUE.

See https://github.com/illumos/illumos-gate/blob/master/usr/src/uts/common/inet/tcp/

Fusion